Euphorbia itremensis is a species of plant in the family Euphorbiaceae. It is endemic to Madagascar.  Its natural habitats are rocky areas. It is threatened by habitat loss.

References

Endemic flora of Madagascar
itremensis
Vulnerable plants
Taxonomy articles created by Polbot